The 1989 World Mountain Running Championships was the 5th edition of the global mountain running competition, World Mountain Running Championships, organised by the World Mountain Running Association and was held in Châtillon-en-Diois, France on 16 September 1989.

Results

Men
Distance 16.4 km, difference in height 1130 m (climb).

Men team

Men short distance

Men shot distance team

Men junior

Men junior team

Women

Women team

References

External links
 World Mountain Running Association official web site

World Mountain Running Championships
World Long Distance Mountain Running